Elissa Tenny (born 1953) is an American academic and educator and the current President of the School of the Art Institute of Chicago (SAIC). The 15th president, she is the first woman to head the school.

Founded in 1866, the School of the Art Institute of Chicago is a top-ranked art and design college and was named the "most influential art school in the United States" in Columbia University's Art Critics National Arts Journalism Survey.

Tenny received a Bachelor of Arts in Business Administration from Stockton University in 1975, a Master of Arts in Media Studies from The New School in 1977, and a Doctor of Education from the University of Pennsylvania in 2007. She started her career in education while attending the New School, eventually holding positions of Acting Dean (1998–2001) and Vice Dean (2001–02). From 2002 to 2010, she was Provost and Dean at Bennington College, joining SAIC as Provost in 2010, where she served until being named president in 2016.

References

Living people
1953 births